The Rainbow Children is the twenty-fourth studio album by American recording artist Prince. It was released on November 20, 2001 by NPG Records and Redline Entertainment. It was also released through Prince's website earlier in the year. It is the first album released outside of the NPG Music Club to be released under the name of Prince again, as he had reverted to his previous stage name from his symbolic moniker a year earlier. It was released on double vinyl with a glossy colour booklet, and was not available on vinyl again until the Legacy release in 2020.

This concept album illustrates common Prince themes of spirituality and human sexuality, as well as love and racism, through the fictitious story of a social movement toward a Martin Luther King Jr.-inspired utopian society. The album seems to allude to his recent conversion to the Jehovah's Witnesses denomination, but Egyptian monotheism and New Age concepts such as the Akashic records are used as metaphors as well. Jazzier than any of his previous efforts, it was met with mixed reactions. Some fans saw the album as a musical and spiritual evolution for Prince.

Musically, The Rainbow Children marked a shift back towards a more "organic" sound for Prince. Unlike its predecessors, the album featured live drums, and made ample use of horns. Many songs were performed live during Prince's 2002 One Nite Alone... Tour, which became an instant success with fans and critics alike.

The Rainbow Children was released through the independent distributor Redline Entertainment, and was released with minimal promotion per Prince's wishes, as he wanted to focus more on the music and less on the sales factor of the release. It has sold 158,000 copies in US stores as of summer 2007, and an estimated 560,000 copies worldwide.

The album also had a dedicated promotional website that offered the tracks "She Loves Me 4 Me" and "Mellow" as free MP3 downloads.

The album cover features Cbabi Bayoc's "The Reine Keis Quintet". Prince favored the painting of a women's band, as he was backed by an all-female ensemble.

Track listing 
All songs written and produced by Prince.

Additional notes:
Tracks 15–21 are all hidden tracks and are all silent with the exception of track 21, which gradually fades in to the repetition of the word "one" being sung.

Charts

References

Further reading

External links
 

2001 albums
Prince (musician) albums
Albums produced by Prince (musician)
NPG Records albums
Concept albums